Yazdu (also Romanized as Yazdū) is a village in Beyarjomand Rural District, Beyarjomand District, Shahrud County, Semnan Province, Iran. At the 2006 census, its population was 71, in 23 families.

References 

Populated places in Shahrud County